Louis-Philippe Mariauchau d’Esgly (24 April 1710 – 4 June 1788) was the eighth bishop of the diocese of Quebec.

Life
Louis-Philippe Mariauchau d’Esgly was born 24 April 1710, the second son of Captain Francois Mariauchau d'Esgly (1670-1730), of the Dauphin's Regiment and the Governor-General's Guards; King's Lieutenant at Trois-Rivières. His mother, Louise-Philippe Chartier de Lotbinière (1690-1725), was the daughter of René-Louis Chartier de Lotbinière. He was godson of his mother's first cousin, Pierre de Rigaud, Marquis de Vaudreuil-Cavagnial, and he himself was a first cousin of Michel Chartier de Lotbinière, Marquis de Lotbinière.

After completing his studies at the Séminaire de Québec, he was ordained priest in 1734 and appointed pastor of Saint-Pierre-d'Orléans, which also included duties at Saint-Laurent in L'Arbre-Sec. After thirty-five years of humble ministry, he was called to the episcopate and consecrated coadjutor of Quebec, 12 July 1772, the first native of Canada to attain to the dignity of bishop. The Lotbinière family had lobbied the governor, and Bishop Briand thought it best to agree even though his proposed successor was older than he and deaf. While accepting the position, Esgly chose to remain parish priest at St. Pierre. In 1775 he made a pastoral visit to the other parishes on the Île d'Orléans.

On the resignation of Bishop Briand, he succeeded to the See of Quebec 29 November 1784, but continued to serve as pastor at St. Pierre. One of his first acts was to appoint his vicars general for the vast diocese. He confirmed Henri-François Gravé de La Rive at Quebec, Pierre Garreau at Trois-Rivières, and Étienne Montgolfier at Montreal, while he oversaw things from Saint-Pierre-d'Orléans.

In his first pastoral letter he alludes to the appointment of a coadjutor, a precaution justified by age, infirmity, and the necessity of securing a successor. Bishop Jean-François Hubert, who was a missioner at Notre-Dame-de l’Assomption near Detroit at the time, was nominated coadjutor that same year, but the approval of the British Government was withheld till 1786.

The main question that concerned him was the lack of priests. Bishop d'Esglis tried unsuccessfully to supply the dearth of clergy by obtaining priests from France. The British Government preferred the emigration of priests for the settlements in Upper Canada and the Maritime Provinces. Pending the arrival of a missionary for the Acadians, a layman was authorized to baptize and witness marriage contracts. Acadians settled in the maritime provinces and confirmed Joseph-Mathurin Bourg as Vicar-General for that area. Fathers Girouard, Le Roux, and Donat, of the congregation of the Holy Ghost served there, while the Irish and Scotch Catholics of the same region were attended by the Abbé Phelan and Capuchin James Jones, who resided at Halifax. Bishop John Butler of Cork sent some priests, recruited by the Irish Father Thomas Hussey, representative of the Diocese of Quebec in London. In 1787, Bishop d'Esglis issued a pastoral letter to all the faithful of the lower provinces, exhorting them to union and steadfastness in the Faith.

He died  4 June 1788 in the fifty-fifth year of his priesthood and was buried at Saint-Pierre. In 1969, his remains were transferred to the crypt of the basilica of Notre-Dame in Quebec.

See also 
 Joseph-Laurent Bertrand

References

Sources
 Biography at the Dictionary of Canadian Biography Online

Roman Catholic bishops of Quebec
18th-century Roman Catholic bishops in Canada
1710 births
1788 deaths
Burials at the Cathedral-Basilica of Notre-Dame de Québec